The 1914 Washington & Jefferson Red and Black football team was an American football team that represented Washington & Jefferson College as an independent during the 1914 college football season. Led by third-year head Bob Folwell, Washington & Jefferson compiled a record of 10–1.

Schedule

References

Washington and Jefferson
Washington & Jefferson Presidents football seasons
Washington and Jefferson Red and Black football